Hor Awibre (also known as Hor I) was an Egyptian pharaoh of the 13th Dynasty reigning from c. 1777 BC until 1775 BC or for a few months, c. 1760 BC or c. 1732 BC, during the Second Intermediate Period.  Hor is known primarily thanks to his nearly intact tomb discovered in 1894 and the rare life-size wooden statue of the king's Ka it housed.

Attestations

Hor Awibre is mentioned on the Turin canon, a king list compiled in the early Ramesside period. The canon gives his name on the 7th column, line 17 (Gardiner entry 6.17 ). Beyond the Turin canon, Hor remained unattested until the discovery in 1894 of his nearly intact tomb in Dashur by Jacques de Morgan, see below.

Further attestations of Hor have come to light since then, comprising a jar lid of unknown provenance and a plaque, now in the Berlin Museum, both inscribed with his name. Another plaque with his name was found at the pyramid of Amenemhat I at Lisht. There were found several faience plaques with 13th Dynasty king's names. More importantly, a granite architrave with the cartouches of Hor and his successor Sekhemrekhutawy Khabaw in close juxtaposition was uncovered in Tanis, in the Nile Delta. The architrave probably originated in Memphis and came to the Delta region during the Hyksos period. Based on this evidence, the egyptologist Kim Ryholt proposed that Sekhemrekhutawy Khabaw was a son and coregent of Hor Awibre.

Reign
According to Ryholt and Darrell Baker, Hor Awibre was the fifteenth ruler of the 13th Dynasty. Alternatively, Detlef Franke and Jürgen von Beckerath see him as the fourteenth king of the dynasty. No evidence has been found that relate Hor to his predecessor on the throne, Renseneb, which led Ryholt and Baker to propose that he was an usurper.

Hor Awibre's reign length is partially lost to a lacuna of the Turin canon and is consequently unknown. According to the latest reading of the Turin canon by Ryholt, the surviving traces indicate the number of days as "[... and] 7 days". In the previous authoritative reading of the canon by Alan Gardiner, which dates to the 1950s, this was read as 
"[...] 7 months". This led scholars such as Miroslav Verner and Darrell Baker to believe that Hor's reign was ephemeral, while Ryholt's reading leaves a longer reign possible and indeed Ryholt credits Hor with 2 years of reign. In any case, Hor most likely reigned only for a short time, in particular not long enough to prepare a pyramid, which was still the common burial place for kings of the early 13th dynasty. Regardless of the duration of his reign, Hor was seemingly succeeded by his two sons Sekhemrekhutawy Khabaw and Djedkheperew.

Tomb

Hor is mainly known from his nearly intact tomb, discovered in 1894 by Jacques de Morgan working in collaboration with Georges Legrain and Gustave Jequier in Dahshur. The tomb was nothing more than a shaft built on the north-east corner of the pyramid of the 12th Dynasty pharaoh Amenemhat III. The tomb was originally made for a member of Amenemhat's court and was later enlarged for Hor, with the addition of a stone burial chamber and antechamber.

Although the tomb had been pillaged in antiquity, it still contained a naos with a rare life-size wooden statue of the Ka of the king. This statue is one of the most frequently reproduced examples of Ancient Egyptian art and is now in the Egyptian Museum under the catalog number CG259. It is one of the best-preserved and most accomplished wooden statues to survive from antiquity, and illustrates an artistic genre that must once have been common in Egyptian art, but has rarely survived in such good condition.

The tomb also contained the partly gilded rotten wooden coffin of the king. The king's wooden funerary mask, its eyes of stones set in bronze, had been stripped of its gold gilding but still held the king's skull. Hor's canopic box was also found complete with its canopic vessels. 
The mummy of the king had been ransacked for his jewelry and only Hor's skeleton was left in his coffin. The king was determined to have been in his forties at the time of his death. Other artifacts from the tomb include small statues, alabaster and wooden vases, some jewelry, two alabaster stelae inscribed with blue painted hieroglyphs and a number of flails, scepters and wooden staves which had all been disposed in a long wooden case. These had been intentionally broken in pieces. The tomb also housed weapons such as a granite macehead and a golden-leaf dagger and numerous pottery.

Next to the burial of Hor was found the totally undisturbed tomb of the 'king's daughter' Nubhetepti-khered. She was likely a daughter of Hor or otherwise a daughter of Amenemhat III.

References

18th-century BC Pharaohs
Pharaohs of the Thirteenth Dynasty of Egypt